Public Enemy's Wife is a 1936 American crime film directed by Nick Grinde and written by Abem Finkel and Harold Buckley. The film stars Pat O'Brien, Margaret Lindsay, Robert Armstrong, Cesar Romero, Dick Foran and Joe King. The film was released by Warner Bros. on July 25, 1936.

Plot

Cast        
 Pat O'Brien as Lee Laird
 Margaret Lindsay as Judith Roberts Maroc
 Robert Armstrong as Gene Ferguson
 Cesar Romero as Gene Maroc
 Dick Foran as Thomas Duncan McKay
 Joe King as Wilcox 
 Dick Purcell as Louie 
 Addison Richards as Warden Williams
 Hal K. Dawson as Daugherty
 Harry Hayden as Justice of the Peace
 Al Bridge as Swartzman 
 Kenneth Harlan as G-Man
 Selmer Jackson as Duffield
 William Pawley as Correlli

References

External links 
 
 
 
 

1936 films
1930s English-language films
Warner Bros. films
American crime films
1936 crime films
Films directed by Nick Grinde
American black-and-white films
1930s American films